Gryphaea, one of the genera known as devil's toenails, is a genus of extinct oysters, marine bivalve mollusks in the family Gryphaeidae.

These fossils range from the Triassic period to the middle Paleogene period, but are mostly restricted to the Triassic and Jurassic. They are particularly common in many parts of Britain.

These oysters lived on the sea bed in shallow waters, possibly in large colonies. The complete fossils consist of two articulated valves: a larger gnarly-shaped shell (the "toenail") and a smaller, flattened shell, the "lid". The soft parts of the animal occupied the cavity between the two shells, just like modern oysters. The shells also feature prominent growth bands. The larger, curved shell sat within the mud on the sea floor. These shells are sometimes found in fossil plates along with Turritella, clams, and sometimes sharks' teeth and fossilized fish scales.  Its distribution is common in areas of both Europe.

A classic location to find these fossils is Redcar, on the northeast coast of England. There used to be a common folk belief that carrying one of these fossils could prevent rheumatism.

The name "devil's toenail" is also used for some fossil species of the genus Exogyra, which is in the same family (Gryphaeidae) as Gryphaea.

Two genera have been removed from this genus: Pycnodonte and Texigryphaea.

Selected species
Gryphaea arcuata
Gryphaea dilatata

References

External links
 The Bedford Museum: Gryphaea
 Fossil Folklore: Devil's Toenails – Natural History Museum, London

Gryphaeidae
Triassic bivalves
Prehistoric bivalve genera
Jurassic bivalves
Cretaceous bivalves
Paleocene bivalves
Eocene bivalves
Fossils of Great Britain
Carnian genus first appearances
Eocene genus extinctions
Fossils of Serbia